Eupetochira axysta is a moth in the family Xyloryctidae. It was described by Edward Meyrick in 1927. It is found in South Africa.

The wingspan is about 24 mm. The forewings are white and the hindwings are light grey, becoming white towards the dorsum.

References

Endemic moths of South Africa
Xyloryctidae
Moths described in 1927